Grosvenor Place in Bath, Somerset, England was built around 1790 by John Eveleigh. It lies alongside the A4 London Road and many of the houses are listed buildings.

Grosvenor House is a terrace of 42 houses (numbered 1 to 41), with double curves to the large central house.

Number 23, which was formerly the Grosvenor Hotel until the 1970s, has large Ionic half columns on the 1st and 2nd floors. It then became affordable The Guinness Partnership flats. In 2020 ownership returned to Bath and North East Somerset Council, who will convert it to supported accommodation for former rough sleepers.

Grosvenor Lodge and Grosvenor Villa are two houses at the end of the south side which were built slightly later.

See also

 List of Grade I listed buildings in Bath and North East Somerset

References

Residential buildings completed in 1790
Grade I listed buildings in Bath, Somerset
Grade II listed buildings in Bath, Somerset
Streets in Bath, Somerset